Marco Visconti is a 1925 Italian silent historical drama film directed by Aldo De Benedetti. It was based on the 1834 novel of the same name by Tommaso Grossi, which was later adapted into a 1941 sound film.

Cast
 Ruggero Barni
 Toto Lo Bue
 Bruto Castellani
 Adolfo Geri
 Amleto Novelli
 Gino Soldarelli
 Cecyl Tryan
 Perla Yves

References

Bibliography
 Goble, Alan. The Complete Index to Literary Sources in Film. Walter de Gruyter, 1999.

External links

1925 films
1920s Italian-language films
Films directed by Aldo De Benedetti
Italian silent feature films
Italian black-and-white films
1920s historical drama films
Italian historical drama films
Films set in the 14th century
1925 drama films
Silent historical drama films
1920s Italian films